Bryotropha italica is a moth of the family Gelechiidae. It is found in Italy.

The wingspan is 13–14 mm. The forewings are dark fuscous with pale ochreous and light grey scales in the central part. The hindwings are greyish brown, but darker towards the apex. Adults have been recorded on wing from late May to mid-July.

The larvae possibly feed on Melandrium album.

Etymology
The name of this species refers to the country of origin.

References

Moths described in 2005
italica
Moths of Europe